Gabriel Fernando Roth (born 5 May 1979 in Venado Tuerto, Santa Fe) is an Argentine footballer playing for Rangers.

External links
 Argentine Primera statistics 
 Apertura 2007 Statistics at Terra.com.ar 
 

1979 births
Living people
Argentine footballers
Argentine expatriate footballers
Association football midfielders
Gimnasia y Esgrima de Jujuy footballers
San Martín de San Juan footballers
Independiente Rivadavia footballers
Talleres de Córdoba footballers
Córdoba CF players
Rangers de Talca footballers
Club Atlético Patronato footballers
Atlético Bucaramanga footballers
Categoría Primera A players
Primera B de Chile players
Expatriate footballers in Chile
Expatriate footballers in Spain
Expatriate footballers in Colombia
Argentine people of German descent
People from General López Department
Sportspeople from Santa Fe Province